This is a list of administrators and governors of Cross River State, Nigeria, including leaders of South-Eastern State.
South-Eastern State was formed on May 27, 1967 when Eastern Region was split into East-Central, Rivers and South-Eastern states. The state was renamed Cross River State in 1976.

See also
States of Nigeria
List of state governors of Nigeria

References

Cross River